The European Union Aviation Safety Agency (EASA) is an agency of the European Union (EU) with responsibility for civil aviation safety. It carries out certification, regulation and standardisation and also performs investigation and monitoring. It collects and analyses safety data, drafts and advises on safety legislation and co-ordinates with similar organisations in other parts of the world.

The idea of a European-level aviation safety authority goes back to 1996, but the agency was legally established only in 2002; it began its work in 2003.

History
Based in Cologne, Germany, the agency was created on 15 July 2002 as the "European Aviation Safety Agency", and reached full functionality in 2008, taking over functions of the Joint Aviation Authorities. It was renamed the "European Union Aviation Safety Agency" in 2018. European Free Trade Association countries participate in the agency. The United Kingdom was a member until the end of the Brexit transition period on 31 December 2020.

The responsibilities of the agency include the analysis and research of safety parameters, authorizing foreign operators, and advising the European Commission on the drafting of EU legislation. It also implements and monitors safety rules (including inspections in the member states), gives type certification of aircraft and components, and approves organisations involved in the design, manufacture and maintenance of aeronautical products.

As part of Single European Sky II (SES-II), an initiative to standardize and coordinate all air traffic control over the EU, the agency has been given additional tasks, which were implemented before 2013. Since 4 December 2012, EASA is able to certify functional airspace blocks if more than three parties are involved.

The EU commission is proposing to further expand EASA mandate to act the European Performance Review Board, with a clear separation of National Supervisory Agencies and Air Navigation Service Providers

In 2012, the European Court of Auditors (ECA) found that the agency did not have an agency-specific conflict of interest policy and procedures. EASA did not obtain or assess the declarations of interest for staff, management board, board of appeal and experts. In its report, ECA declared that:

It was recommended that the organization adopt its own ethical standards because the then-existing condition exposed the agency to a substantial crisis of credibility as well as the incidence of favoritism and conflict of interest. For member-countries and other stakeholders, fairness is of paramount importance. This is because the European Union has been increasingly strengthening EASA's role, giving the agency independence. A discussion regarding the permission for the agency to impose financial penalties for safety violations is also underway.

Responsibilities
EASA is responsible for new type certificates and other design-related airworthiness approvals for aircraft, engines, propellers and parts. EASA works with the EU member states' civil aviation authorities (CAAs) but has taken over many of their functions in the interest of aviation standardisation across the EU and in the non-EU member Turkey. EASA is also responsible for assisting the European Commission in negotiating international harmonisation agreements with the "rest of the world" on behalf of the EU member states, and it concludes technical agreements at a working level directly with its counterparts around the world such as the US Federal Aviation Administration (FAA). EASA also sets policy for aeronautical repair stations (Part 145 organisations in Europe and the US, also known as Part 571 organisations in Canada) and issues repair station certificates for repair stations located outside the EU, which permit foreign repair stations to perform work that is acceptable to the EU on its aircraft). EASA has developed regulations for air operations, flight crew licensing and non-EU aircraft used in the EU, which applied since the required European legislation to expand the agency's remit entered into force. The legislation was published on 19 March 2008.

EASA have had its scope enlarged to (as part of the new delegation in 2018) also cover UAV/drones. The first 2 regulations (EU DR 2019-945 & EU IR 947) for drones was effective by 30/12-19 in order for them to also cover to UK (Brexit). Since then the U-space regulation package is being ready for implementation by 26/1-23.

Annual safety review
The agency publishes an annual safety review with statistics on European and worldwide civil aviation safety. Some information derives from the International Civil Aviation Organization and the NLR Air Transport Safety Institute.

In June 2020, EASA banned Pakistan International Airlines from flying to Europe after a fatal crash in May caused by a pilot error. An investigation discovered that a third of pilot licenses in Pakistan are fraudulent.

Member states
In addition to the member states of the European Union, the members of the European Free Trade Association, i.e. Liechtenstein, Norway, Switzerland, and Iceland, have been granted participation under Article 129 of the Basic Regulation (Regulation 2018/1139) and are members of the management board without voting rights.

There are also numerous working relationships with other regional and international authorities. For example, EASA cooperates with most of the EU's Eastern Partnership member states through EASA's Pan-European Partners (PANEP) initiative in which countries such as Armenia, Azerbaijan, Georgia, Moldova and Ukraine cooperate on the implementation of EU aviation safety rules and comprehensive aviation agreements.

Certification
On 28 September 2003, the agency took over responsibility for the airworthiness and environmental certification of all aeronautical products, parts, and appliances designed, manufactured, maintained or used by persons under the regulatory oversight of EU Member States.

Certain categories of aeroplanes are however deliberately left outside EASA responsibility, thus remaining under control of the national CAAs: ultralights, experimentals, and balloons are a few examples. They are referred to as "Annex I" aeroplanes (formerly known as "Annex II“ aeroplanes), and are listed on the EASA website.

In July 2017, EASA and the Civil Aviation Authority of Singapore entered into a working arrangement to recognize each other's certifications.

Aircraft classification
The agency defines several classes of aircraft, each with their own ruleset for certification and maintenance and repair. EASA established safety levels according to a risk hierarchy. For non-commercial operations, a set of rules were developed to achieve safety goals. EASA difference non-commercial operations between non-commercial operations other than complex aircraft (NCO) and non-commercial operations with complex motor-powered aircraft.

EASA has started to introduce basic regulations for unmanned aircraft (drones) which are divided between open category (no operational approval is required), specific category (requires risk-based operational authorization), and certified category, where pilots needs a license and operators receive a certificate.

See also

 EASA pilot licensing
 List of aviation, aerospace and aeronautical abbreviations
 EASA CS-VLA (Certification Specification for Very Light Aircraft)
 European Civil Aviation Conference
 European Network of Civil Aviation Safety Investigation Authorities (ENCASIA)
 European Organisation for the Safety of Air Navigation (Eurocontrol)
 Federal Aviation Administration (United States)
 Federal Aviation Regulations
 Civil aviation authority

References

External links
 EASA website
 EASA member states
 European Strategic Safety Initiative

2003 establishments in Germany
2003 in the European Union
Agencies of the European Union
Air traffic control in Europe
Aviation authorities
Aviation safety in Europe
Civil aviation authorities in Europe
Government agencies established in 2003
Organisations based in Cologne
Transport and the European Union
Transport organisations based in Germany